The 1953–54 New Zealand rugby union tour of Britain, Ireland, France and North America was a rugby union tour undertaken by the New Zealand national team which toured Europe and North America. The team was captained by Bob Stuart.

Between October 1953 and March 1954, the team played 36 games including four test matches, one each against Ireland, England, Wales, and France. They won all but four games, losing only to Cardiff, Wales, France and South West France.

Matches
Scores and results list New Zealand's points tally first.

Touring party

Management
Manager: N. Millard
Assistant manager: A. E. Marslin
Captain: Bob Stuart

Backs
Jack Kelly (Auckland)
Bob Scott (Auckland)
Matthew O'Connolly (Canterbury)
Morrie Dixon (Canterbury)
Allan Elsom (Canterbury)
Stu Freebairn (Manawatu)
Ron Jarden (Wellington)
James Fitzgerald (Wellington)
John Tanner (Auckland)
Brian Fitzpatrick (Wellington)
Colin Loader (Wellington)
Doug Wilson (Canterbury)
Guy Bowers (Wellington)
Laurie Haig (Otago)
Vincent Bevan (Wellington)
Keith Davis (Auckland)

Forwards
Bill McCaw (Southland)
Bob Stuart (Canterbury)
Bill Clark (Wellington)
Peter Jones (North Auckland)
Bob O'Dea (Thames Valley)
Desmond Oliver (Otago)
Keith Bagley (Manawatu)
Nelson Dalzell (Canterbury)
Richard White (Poverty Bay)
Ian Clarke (Waikato)
Peter Eastgate (Canterbury)
Kevin Skinner (Otago)
Hallard White (Auckland)
Ronald Hemi (Waikato)
Arthur Woods (Southland)

References

Notes

Bibliography

External links
 1953–1954 Tour in Details

All Black tour
All Black tour
New Zealand national rugby union team tours of Europe
Rugby union tours of England
Rugby union tours of Ireland
Rugby union tours of Scotland
Rugby union tours of Wales
Rugby union tours of France
Rugby union tours of Canada
Rugby union tours of the United States
tour
tour
tour
tour
tour
tour
tour
tour
tour